The 2006 Fed Cup was the 44th edition of the most important competition between national teams in women's tennis.

The final took place at Spiroudome in Charleroi, Belgium, on 16–17 September. The home team, Belgium, lost to Italy, 2–3, giving Italy their first title in their first final and Belgium's second final.

World Group

Draw

World Group play-offs

The four losing teams in the World Group first round ties (Austria, France, Germany and Russia), and four winners of the World Group II ties (China, Croatia, Czech Republic and Japan) entered the draw for the World Group play-offs.

Date: 15–16 July

World Group II

The World Group II was the second highest level of Fed Cup competition in 2006. Winners will advance to the World Group play-offs, and losers played in the World Group II play-offs.

Date: 22–23 April

World Group II play-offs

The four losing teams from World Group II (Argentina, Indonesia, Switzerland and Thailand) played off against qualifiers from Zonal Group I. Two teams qualified from Europe/Africa Zone (Israel and Slovakia), one team from the Asia/Oceania Zone (Australia), and one team from the Americas Zone (Canada).

Date: 14–15 July

Americas Zone

 Nations in bold advanced to the higher level of competition.
 Nations in italics were relegated down to a lower level of competition.

Group I
Venue: Club Campestre de Medellín, Medellín, Colombia (outdoor clay)

Dates: 19–22 April

Participating Teams

Group II
Venue: Parque del Este, Santo Domingo, Dominican Republic (outdoor hard)

Dates: 18–20 April

Participating Teams

Asia/Oceania Zone

 Nations in bold advanced to the higher level of competition.
 Nations in italics were relegated down to a lower level of competition.

Group I
Venue: Olympic Park, Seoul, South Korea (outdoor hard)

Dates: 20–22 April

Participating Teams

Group II
Venue: Olympic Park, Seoul, South Korea (outdoor hard)

Dates: 20–21 April

Participating Teams

Europe/Africa Zone

 Nations in bold advanced to the higher level of competition.
 Nations in italics were relegated down to a lower level of competition.

Group I
Venue: TC Lokomotiv, Plovdiv, Bulgaria (outdoor clay)

Dates: 17–22 April

Participating Teams

Group II
Venue: Club Ali Bey, Manavgat, Antalya, Turkey (outdoor clay)

Dates: 26–29 April

Participating Teams

Group III
Venue: Club Ali Bey, Manavgat, Antalya, Turkey (outdoor clay)

Dates: 26–29 April

Participating Teams

Rankings
The rankings were measured after the three points during the year that play took place, and were collated by combining points earned from the previous four years.

References

External links 
 Fed Cup

 
Billie Jean King Cups by year
Fed Cup
2006 in women's tennis